Planarioidea is a superfamily of freshwater triclads that comprises the families Dendrocoelidae, Kenkiidae and Planariidae.

Phylogeny
Phylogenetic supertree after Sluys et al., 2009:

References 

Continenticola
Animal superfamilies